Vestibular cortex is the portion of the cerebrum which responds to input from the vestibular system.

The location is not well defined, but some research indicates a right hemisphere dominance.

Lesions of the vestibular nucleus impair function.

The "temporo-peri-Sylvian vestibular cortex" (TPSVC) has been proposed as an analog to parietoinsular vestibular cortex found in monkeys.

References

Cerebral cortex
Vestibular system